was a castle structure in Nagaoka, Niigata, Japan.  The site is located on a 227-meter mountain. Young Uesugi Kenshin spent five years in the castle.

History
The exact date of the castle's foundation is unknown but built in the Muromachi period. In 1543, Uesugi Kenshin left Kasugayama Castle and entered the castle as a joint commander by Nagao Harukage`s order.

In 1544, Kenshin made his first battle against local lords opposed to the Nagao clan in the castle and broke the siege.

In 1548, Kenshin returned to Kasugayama Castle as a feudal load of the Nagao clan.
The castle is now only ruins, with some earthenwalls, well and moats. Its ruins have been protected as a Prefectural Historic Site.

See also
List of Historic Sites of Japan (Niigata)

References

Castles in Niigata Prefecture
Historic Sites of Japan
Former castles in Japan
Ruined castles in Japan
Uesugi clan
15th-century establishments in Japan